The Federation of Free African Trade Unions of South Africa (FOFATUSA) was a national trade union federation for unions representing black workers in South Africa.

History
Unions representing black workers were not permitted to affiliate to the Trade Union Council of South Africa (TUCSA), as in order to register with the Government of South Africa, it only admitted unions representing white and "coloured" workers.  While many unions of black workers joined the left-wing South African Congress of Trade Unions, five more right-wing unions remained informally linked with TUCSA affiliates.  Late in 1959, they decided to form their own federation, FOFATUSA.

FOFATUSA was linked with the Pan-African Congress, and also affiliated to the International Confederation of Free Trade Unions, which funded many of its activities.  Lucy Mvubelo was appointed as its president, while Jacob Nyaose became its general secretary, and Sarah Chitja was national secretary.

While the federation aimed to expand its activities, this did not occur.  By 1962, its fifteen affiliates had a total of only 17,280 members.  That year, TUCSA permitted unions of black workers to affiliate, and FOFATUSA declined.  It was dissolved in 1966, with its remaining affiliates transferring to TUCSA.

Affiliates
In 1962, the federation had the following affiliates:

References

National trade union centres of South Africa
Trade unions established in 1959
Trade unions disestablished in 1966